The Providence Atoll is part of the Farquhar Group of islands in the Seychelles that are part of the Outer Islands, with a distance of  southwest of the capital, Victoria, on Mahé Island.

History
The atoll was discovered in 1501 by Joao da Nova, a Portuguese explorer. 
The atoll was under British control until 1976 when they became part of Seychelles at the time of independence.
Providence got its name after an event which happened in 1763. 
A French frigate, ”Heureuse” , was stranded on its reef, 705 km from Victoria near the northern end of the atoll. The sailors reached Providence Island and were rescued a month later. It proved the salvation(fr: Providence) of the French sailors.
Cerf got its name after one of the ships of Captain Nicolas Morphey, called Le Cerf, who sighted the island on 30 July 1756.

Geography
The islands of Providence Atoll are small, coraline and inhospitable.
The total area covered by the atoll is approximating . The aggregate land area, however, is only .
West of the atoll, the sea-bottom plunges steeply to 180 metres only, 2.5 km beyond the fringing reef.

Providence Atoll Islands
There are two islands in the atoll:

Providence Island
It has the shape of a kite.

Cerf Island

Demographics
But in 2006, Cyclone Bondo destroyed most of the buildings and about 60 per cent of the coconut trees, 
The government plans on building an eco-tourism resort on the island in 2018, and a bidding process is already on the way.
Cerf Island has never been permanently inhabited though temporary fishermens' huts were recorded in the 19th century.
There are many shipwrecks including records of Maldivian mariner presence in this atoll from the 20th century, when a trading vessel from southern Maldives reached Providence Atoll after drifting in the ocean for weeks.

Administration
The atoll belongs to Outer Islands District.

Transport
Providence Island has an airstrip operational from 2020. The airstrip enables additional support for the surveillance of the area by the Seychelles People's Defence Force. The island has no jetty. The island is rarely visited except by the occasional Island Conservation Society expedition or by an Islands Development Company (IDC) boat from Mahé.

Economics
Providence Island was inhabited by workers engaged in fishing and copra production probably continuously from at least 1846 until late 2006. Following Cyclone Bondo, the island was evacuated on 26 December 2006. A subsequent attempt to construct an airstrip to service the inhabitants was abandoned and the island has remained uninhabited since then.

Flora and fauna
Providence Atoll occupies an extensive bank of shallow water well known for its profusion of fish.

There are no alien mammals and the only land bird is Madagascar fody.

Significant numbers of greater crested tern and black-naped tern breed at Cerf Island. There are also very large numbers of grey heron breeding in the largest heronry of Seychelles and small numbers of fairy tern.

Tourism
The island is a famous fly-fish destination

Image gallery

References

External links 

 National Bureau of Statistics
 National Bureau of Statistics - Partial info on islands
 

Outer Islands (Seychelles)
Atolls of Seychelles